The 25th Producers Guild of America Awards (also known as 2014 Producers Guild Awards), honoring the best film and television producers of 2013, were held at The Beverly Hilton Hotel in Beverly Hills, California on January 19, 2014. The nominees for documentary motion picture were announced on November 26, 2013. The nominees for television and digital series were announced on December 3, 2013. The nominees for motion picture, animated feature, and long-form television were announced on January 2, 2014.

Winners and nominees

Film
{| class=wikitable style="width="100%"
|-
! colspan="2" style="background:#abcdef;"| Darryl F. Zanuck Award for Outstanding Producer of Theatrical Motion Pictures
|-
| colspan="2" style="vertical-align:top;"|
 12 Years a Slave – Brad Pitt, Dede Gardner, Jeremy Kleiner, Steve McQueen, and Anthony Katagas (TIE) Gravity – Alfonso Cuarón and David Heyman (TIE) American Hustle – Charles Roven, Richard Suckle, Megan Ellison, and Jonathan Gordon
 Blue Jasmine – Letty Aronson and Stephen Tenenbaum
 Captain Phillips – Scott Rudin, Dana Brunetti, and Michael De Luca
 Dallas Buyers Club – Robbie Brenner and Rachel Winter
 Her – Megan Ellison, Spike Jonze, and Vincent Landay
 Nebraska – Albert Berger and Ron Yerxa
 Saving Mr. Banks – Alison Owen, Ian Collie, and Philip Steuer
 The Wolf of Wall Street – Riza Aziz, Emma Tillinger Koskoff, and Joey McFarland
|-
! colspan="2" style="background:#abcdef;"| Outstanding Producer of Animated Theatrical Motion Pictures
|-
| colspan="2" style="vertical-align:top;"|
 Frozen – Peter Del Vecho The Croods – Kristine Belson and Jane Hartwell
 Despicable Me 2 – Chris Meledandri and Janet Healy
 Epic – Lori Forte and Jerry Davis
 Monsters University – Kori Rae
|-
! colspan="2" style="background:#abcdef;"| Outstanding Producer of Documentary Theatrical Motion Pictures
|-
| colspan="2" style="vertical-align:top;"|
 We Steal Secrets: The Story of WikiLeaks – Alexis Bloom, Alex Gibney, and Marc Shmuger Far Out Isn't Far Enough: The Tomi Ungerer Story – Brad Bernstein and Rick Cikowski
 Life According to Sam – Andrea Nix Fine, Sean Fine, and Miriam Weintraub
 A Place at the Table – Julie Goldman, Ryan Harrington, Kristi Jacobson, and Lori Silverbush
 Which Way Is the Front Line from Here? The Life and Time of Tim Hetherington – James Brabazon and Nick Quested
|}

Television

Digital

David O. Selznick Achievement Award in Theatrical Motion PicturesBarbara Broccoli and Michael G. WilsonMilestone AwardBob IgerNorman Lear Achievement Award in TelevisionChuck LorreStanley Kramer AwardFruitvale Station

Vanguard Award
Peter Jackson and Joe Letteri

Visionary Award
Chris Meledandri

References

External links
 

 2013
2013 film awards
2013 television awards